Vaswani is a Sindhi Hindu surname. The forefathers of Vaswanis dealt in munj (Tripidium bengalense). They were natives of Multan.

The Vaswanis along with most Sindhis belong to the Lohana caste. They belong to the Kshatriya Varna. 

The Vaswanis, Kirpalanis, Mirchandanis and Idnanis left Multan and migrated to Khudabad. Those of them who joined the Government service were called Amils and the business class were called Bhaibands. In the four above-mentioned families, you will find both Amils and Bhaibands.

On reconstruction of Hyderabad, the first ones to arrive were Vaswani Bhaibands. In the India's partition year of 1947, there were over sixty Vaswani Bhaiband households in Hyderabad, Sindh.

According to Forebears, there are over 6000 people around the world who bear this surname. All Vaswanis share a common ancestry.

Some notable people with the surname include:
Dada Vaswani (1918-2018), Indian spiritual leader
Ram Vaswani (born 1970), English snooker player
Sadhu T. L. Vaswani (1879–1966), Indian educationist
Sunil Vaswani (born 1963), Indian businessman
Suresh Vaswani (born 1960), Indian businessman
Vivek Vaswani (born 1972), Indian actor

References

Indian surnames
Surnames of Indian origin